The Loaded Door is a 1922 American silent Western film directed by Harry A. Pollard and starring Hoot Gibson. It is not known whether the film currently survives.

Plot
As described in a studio publication, Bert Lyons (Gibson) returns to his ranch to discover his foreman dead and the ranch leased to a real estate shark. The new hands seem to be trafficking in booze and narcotics under the guise of raising cattle. He goes to see his sweetheart Molly Grainger (Olmstead) who shares her suspicions. The smugglers do not care for Bert's curiosity and plan to "get him." The new boss of the ranch has designs on Molly, and tells her that he will assist in freeing her brother Joe (Sutherland), who is in prison charged with murder, if she goes with him across the border. Bert learns of this ruse, tricks the smugglers, and rides to Molly's rescue. The smugglers are rounded up, and Joe is freed, leaving Bert and Molly to plan their new home.

Cast
 Hoot Gibson as Bert Lyons
 Gertrude Olmstead as Molly Grainger
 William Ryno as Bud Grainger (credited as Bill Ryno)
 A. Edward Sutherland as Joe Grainger (credited as Eddie Sutherland)
 Noble Johnson as Blackie Lopez
 Joe Harris as Stan Calvert (credited as Joseph Harris)
 Charles Newton as Dad Stewart
 Charles Smiley as Purdy (credited as Charles A. Smiley)
 Victor Potel as Slim
 C.L. Sherwood as Fatty

See also
 Hoot Gibson filmography

References

External links
 

1922 films
1922 Western (genre) films
American black-and-white films
Films directed by Harry A. Pollard
Universal Pictures films
Silent American Western (genre) films
1920s American films
1920s English-language films